My People is an album by American pianist, composer and bandleader Duke Ellington written and recorded in 1963 for a stage show and originally released on Bob Thiele's short-lived Contact label before being reissued on the Flying Dutchman label and later released on CD on the Red Baron label. The album features recordings of compositions by Ellington for a stage show presented in Chicago as part of the Century of Negro Progress Exposition in 1963.

Reception

Released in 1965 to commemorate the 100th anniversary of the Emancipation Proclamation. The reviewer for AllMusic, Stephen Thomas Erlewine wrote: "My People is a snapshot of a specific era and is most interesting as a representation of its time, not as an individual work."

Track listing
All compositions by Duke Ellington and Billy Strayhorn
 "Ain't But the One/Will You Be There?/99%" - 5:16
 "Come Sunday/David Danced Before the Lord" - 6:09
 "My Mother, My Father (Heritage)" - 2:50
 "Montage" - 6:54
 "My People/The Blues" - 8:56
 "Workin' Blues/My Man Sends Me/Jail Blues/Lovin' Lover" - 5:57
 "King Fit the Battle of Alabam'" - 3:25
 "What Color Is Virtue?" - 2:49
Recorded at  Universal Studios, Chicago on August 20 (tracks 1a, 2, 4, 5b, 6a, 6c & 7), August 21 (tracks 1b, 1c, 3, 5a & 8) and August 27 (tracks 6b & 6d), 1963.

Personnel
Duke Ellington – director, narration
Ray Nance - cornet
Bill Berry, Ziggy Harrell, Nat Woodard - trumpet
Booty Wood, Britt Woodman - trombone
Chuck Connors - bass trombone
John Sanders - valve trombone
Rudy Powell - alto saxophone
Pete Clark, Russell Procope - alto saxophone, clarinet
Harold Ashby - tenor saxophone, clarinet
Bob Freedman - tenor saxophone
Billy Strayhorn - piano
Joe Benjamin - bass
Louis Bellson - drums
Juan Amalbert - conga
Joya Sherrill, Lil Greenwood, Jimmy McPhail, Irving Bunton Singers - vocals

References

Flying Dutchman Records albums
Duke Ellington albums
1963 albums
Red Baron Records albums
Albums produced by Bob Thiele